Marbled reef-eel may refer to:

 Uropterygius marmoratus, Marbled reef-eel, or slender conger eel
 Anarchias seychellensis, Seychelles moray, or marbled reef-eel
 Gymnothorax obesus, Speckled moray, or marbled reef eel